Pneuma is an ancient Greek word for "breath", and in a religious context for "spirit" or "soul." 

Pneuma may also refer to:
 Pneuma (journal), a theological journal of the Society for Pentecostal Studies 
 Pneuma: Breath of Life, a 2015 video game by Deco Digital & Bevel Studios
 Pneuma, a character from Xenoblade Chronicles 2

Music 
 Pneuma (Moving Mountains album), 2007
 Pneuma (Michael White album), 1972
 Pneuma (record label), a Spanish early music label
 Pneuma Recordings,  a drum and bass record label based out of San Francisco, USA
 Pneuma (band), a thrash metal band from Costa Rica
 Pneuma (song), a song by Tool, from the album Fear Inoculum

See also 
 Pneumatology, the study of spiritual beings and phenomena
 Pneumatics, the study and application of use of pressurized gas to effect mechanical motion
 Pneumology, another name for pulmonology, medical specialty dealing with the respiratory tract
 Breath of life (disambiguation)